Puma.NET is an open source OCR SDK project for the Microsoft Windows platform available under a BSD license. The project is oriented towards software developers working with Microsoft's .NET Framework and is aimed to provide newly developed applications with OCR capabilities. Puma.NET is a wrapper for CuneiForm.

External links 
 Project Home Page

Freeware
.NET software
Free software programmed in C#
Optical character recognition
Software using the BSD license